André Botha (born 2 July 1972) is a South African cricketer. He played in six first-class matches for Eastern Province in 1993/94.

See also
 List of Eastern Province representative cricketers

References

External links
 

1972 births
Living people
South African cricketers
Eastern Province cricketers
Cricketers from Port Elizabeth